Louis George "Lou" Riecke Jr. (October 2, 1926 – May 31, 2017) was an Olympic weightlifter for the United States.  He also was a coach for the NFL's Pittsburgh Steelers.

Weightlifting achievements
Olympic Games team member (1964)
Set one world record in career

Coaching career
Riecke served as the strength and conditioning coach for the Steelers from 1970 through 1980.  During his tenure, the team won four Super Bowls.

References

External links
Louis Riecke - Hall of Fame at Weightlifting Exchange
Start of 'roids rage, Childs Walker, Baltimore Sun, November 2, 2008

American male weightlifters
Olympic weightlifters of the United States
Weightlifters at the 1964 Summer Olympics
Pittsburgh Steelers coaches
1926 births
2017 deaths